This is a list of amphitheatres in use today.

See also
 List of concert halls
 List of jazz venues
 List of opera houses
 List of Roman amphitheatres
 Lists of stadiums

External links
 10 Best Outdoor Music Venues, USA Today
 Venues ranked by seating capacity, SeatGeek

References 

Contemporary amphitheatres
Amphitheatres, contemporary
Amphitheatres, contemporary